Sven Fischer (born 7 January 1977) is a German retired professional footballer who played as a defender. Fischer made two appearances in the 2. Bundesliga for Hannover 96. He represented the Germany U20 national team at the 1995 FIFA World Youth Championship.

References

External links
 
 

1977 births
Living people
German footballers
Association football midfielders
Germany youth international footballers
2. Bundesliga players
1. FC Köln II players
Hannover 96 players
SV Wilhelmshaven players
Rot-Weiss Essen players